Luzerne Presbyterial Institute, also known as the Wyoming Institute is a historic church school on Institute Street in Wyoming, Pennsylvania.
It was built in 1849 for use as a school, the Luzerne Presbyterial Institute, which closed in 1869. The building was then used as a Sunday school by the Wyoming Presbyterian Church. It was added to the National Register in 1979.

References

Properties of religious function on the National Register of Historic Places in Pennsylvania
Churches completed in 1849
Churches in Luzerne County, Pennsylvania
1849 establishments in Pennsylvania
National Register of Historic Places in Luzerne County, Pennsylvania